Llyn Dulyn is a lake on the edge of the Carneddau range of mountains in Snowdonia, North Wales. Less than a kilometre to its south lies the smaller Llyn Melynllyn. Cliffs rise steeply from the lake edge up to the summits of Garnedd Uchaf and Foel Grach, giving it a dark brooding appearance - hence its name.

The lake was dammed in 1881, to increase its capacity, and was significantly altered in 1931 by Llandudno Waterworks.As a reservoir Dulyn (along with Melynllyn) provided water for the town of Llandudno. The reservoir was repurposed in 1997 for use as hydroelectric generation. 

The outflow from the lake, the Afon Dulyn, also feeds water into neighbouring Llyn Eigiau.  Afon Dulyn flows north-east, passing Tal-y-bont before joining the River Conwy.

The cwm has been the site of a number of aeroplane crashes including that of an American Dakota aircraft which crashed into the cliffs above the lake in 1944 killing all four crew.

Folklore
Marc Morris, in his biography of King Edward I of England, claims that in June 1284 Llyn Cwm Dulyn was the setting for the court of the king for victory celebrations, following his defeat of Llywelyn ap Gruffudd, with an Arthurian theme, including the King's 45th birthday. "Back in Wales, the search for symbols of conquest and the celebration of victory continued in a similarly  Arthurian vein, For most of June, including his forty-fifth birthday, the king chose to keep his court at Llyn Cwm Dulyn, a deep, dark lake in the mountains to the south of Caernarfon, reputed to have mystical properties." That lake, with a similar name, should not be confused with Llyn Dulyn, which is located more than fifteen miles as the crow flies northeast.

A stone causeway (now underwater) once led into the lake. At the end of the causeway was a stone known as the Red Altar. Tradition states that if a person poured water on the altar then it would rain within a day. It is also said that if a person stands at the edge of the lake on one of the three "spirit nights" (including Halloween), then he or she will see images in the water of those who will die within the year. It is further said that people who have led evil lives are sometimes dragged by demons down into the black waters of the lake. A local witch who mysteriously disappeared is said to have suffered this fate.

References 

"The Lakes of North Wales" by Jonah Jones, Whittet Books Ltd, 1987

Caerhun
Dulyn
Dulyn
Aviation accidents and incidents locations in Wales